The manga series Stop!! Hibari-kun! is written and illustrated by Hisashi Eguchi. It was serialized in the manga magazine Weekly Shōnen Jump from the October 19, 1981 issue to the November 28, 1983 issue. The series follows Kōsaku Sakamoto, a high school student who goes to live with yakuza boss Ibari Ōzora and his four children—Tsugumi, Tsubame, Hibari and Suzume—after the death of his mother. Kōsaku is shocked to learn that Hibari, who looks and behaves as a girl, was assigned male at birth.

The chapters were collected and published in four tankōbon volumes by Shueisha starting on November 15, 1982; the last volume was released on January 15, 1984. Futabasha later published it in three volumes in July 1991, and again in two volumes in February 1995. Shueisha republished it in four volumes from May to June 2001. Home-sha published it in two volumes in January 2004. Shogakukan published a Stop!! Hibari-kun! Complete Edition omnibus collection in three volumes from July 2009 to February 2010; Shogakukan later republished the series in another three volumes from May to July 2012.


Volume list

Shueisha

Futabasha

Home-sha

Shogakukan

References

Lists of manga volumes and chapters